Bruce Hector (born October 7, 1994) is an American football defensive tackle for the Arlington Renegades of the XFL. He played college football at South Florida and signed with the Philadelphia Eagles as an undrafted free agent in 2018.

Early life and high school
Hector was born and grew up in Tampa, Florida. He initially attended Gulf High School for two years before transferring to Thomas Richard Robinson High School where he played both offensive and defensive line for the Knights. As a senior, Hector made 55 tackles (9.5 for a loss) and was named first-team Class 5A all-state.

College career
Over the course of his career at South Florida, Hector recorded 90 total tackles (60 solo), 28 tackles for loss and 18 sacks (5th in school history). As a senior, Hector made 38 tackles, 13 for loss, seven sacks with a forced fumble  and one pass defensed and was named second-team All-AAC. Following the end of his senior season, Hector was invited to play in the NFLPA Collegiate Bowl.

Professional career

Philadelphia Eagles
Hector signed with the Philadelphia Eagles as an undrafted free agent in May 2018. He made his NFL debut on September 6, 2018 in the season opener against the Atlanta Falcons. He was waived by the Eagles on October 2, 2018 and subsequently signed to their practice squad two days later. He was promoted to the active roster on October 19, 2018. Hector recorded his first career tackle, a combined sack of Cam Newton along with Brandon Graham, on October 21, 2018 in a 21–17 loss to the Carolina Panthers. Hector was waived by the Eagles again on October 30, 2018 and re-signed to the practice squad on November 2. He was promoted back to the active roster on December 8, 2018. In his rookie season Hector played in eight games, recording two tackles and a half of a sack.

Arizona Cardinals
On August 22, 2019, Hector was traded to the Arizona Cardinals for safety Rudy Ford. Hector was waived during final roster cuts on August 31, 2019.

Philadelphia Eagles (second stint)
Hector was re-signed to the Eagles' practice squad on September 1, 2019. He was promoted to the active roster on October 25, 2019. He was waived on October 28, and re-signed to the practice squad the next day. He was promoted to the active roster on December 18, 2019. Hector was waived on August 7, 2020.

Carolina Panthers
Hector was claimed off waivers by the Carolina Panthers on August 9, 2020. He was waived on September 5, 2020, and signed to the practice squad the next day. He was elevated to the active roster on November 7 and November 14 for the team's weeks 9 and 10 games against the Kansas City Chiefs and Tampa Bay Buccaneers, and reverted to the practice squad after each game. He was placed on the practice squad/COVID-19 list by the team on December 4, 2020, and restored to the practice squad on December 15. His practice squad contract with the team expired after the season on January 11, 2021.

Tennessee Titans
Hector signed with the Tennessee Titans on April 23, 2021. He was waived on July 26, 2021.

Detroit Lions
On July 27, 2021, Hector was claimed off waivers by the Detroit Lions. He was waived on August 31, 2021 and re-signed to the practice squad the next day. He signed a reserve/future contract with the Lions on January 10, 2022.

On August 30, 2022, Hector was waived by the Lions and signed to the practice squad the next day. He was released on October 25.

Arlington Renegades
Hector was selected by the Arlington Renegades in the 2023 XFL Draft.

References

External links

South Florida Bulls bio
Philadelphia Eagles bio 

1994 births
Living people
American football defensive tackles
Players of American football from Tampa, Florida
South Florida Bulls football players
Philadelphia Eagles players
Arizona Cardinals players
Carolina Panthers players
Tennessee Titans players
Detroit Lions players
Arlington Renegades players